The 2022 Challenge Trophy (part of the Toyota National Championships for sponsorship reasons) was the 98th edition of the Challenge Trophy, an annual cup competition contested by amateur teams in men's Canadian soccer. Nine teams played in the tournament, which took place in Vaughan, Ontario from 5–10 October 2022.

Ottawa Gloucester Celtic won their second Challenge Trophy, defeating Edmonton Green & Gold 2–0 in the final.

Teams 
Each of Canada Soccer's thirteen provincial and territorial associations can send one representative to the Challenge Trophy, with teams generally qualifying through a regional preliminary series such as an open cup or league competition.

For the 2022 tournament, ten provincial associations confirmed their participation. New Brunswick's Fredericton Picaroons withdrew from the tournament in September 2022, leaving nine provincial representatives.

1 Bold indicates champion for that year.
2 Competed in previous tournaments as Central City Breakers FC.
3 Replaced Royal-Sélect de Beauport as Quebec representatives.
4 Withdrew from the tournament in September 2022.
5 Replaced Suburban FC as Nova Scotia representatives.
6 Replaced Sherwood-Parkdale Rangers as Prince Edward Island representatives.

Venues 
Matches were played at two different venues in the Maple and Woodbridge subdivisions of Vaughan.

Group stage 
Competing teams are divided into two groups, playing against one another in a single round-robin and advancing to the final round based on their group positioning.

The preliminary schedule was announced by Canada Soccer on 9 August 2022 without kick-off times, and were later confirmed on 29 September 2022.

Group A

Group B

Final round 
The final round (known as Teck Finals Day for sponsorship reasons) pairs equally-ranked opponents from opposite groups to determine a final ranking for the tournament.

References

External links 

Challenge Trophy
Canadian National Challenge Cup